Kanjana Kuthaisong (born April 14, 1997) is a female Thai professional volleyball player.

Career
She played the 2016 Filipino league Shakey's V-League where with Bureau of Customs. They won the silver medal, after losing the final to Pocari Sweat Team.

Kuthaisong played the 2017 season with the Thai club 3BB Nakornnont, playing as an outside spiker.

Clubs 
  Bureau of Customs Transformers (2016)
  3BB Nakornnont (2016–2018)
  King-bangkok (2019–present)
  Generika-Ayala Lifesavers (2019)
  Vietinbank VC (2022–2023)

Awards

Clubs 
 2016 Shakey's V-League -  Runner-Up, with Bureau of Customs Transformers
 2017 Thai-Denmark Super League -  Bronze medal, with 3BB Nakornnont
 2018 Thai-Denmark Super League -  Bronze medal, with 3BB Nakornnont

References

Kanjana Kuthaisong
Living people
1997 births
Kanjana Kuthaisong
Kanjana Kuthaisong